Pavel Andreyevich Poluektov (born January 10, 1992) is a Russian born Kazakh professional  ice hockey goaltender currently playing with Barys Astana of the Kontinental Hockey League (KHL).

External links

1992 births
Living people
People from Serov
Barys Nur-Sultan players
Beibarys Atyrau players
Gornyak Rudny players
Kazakhstani ice hockey goaltenders
Nomad Astana players
Snezhnye Barsy players
Universiade silver medalists for Kazakhstan
Universiade medalists in ice hockey
Competitors at the 2017 Winter Universiade